Alvaro Mexia was a 17th-century Spanish explorer and cartographer of the east coast of Florida. Mexia was stationed in St Augustine and was given a diplomatic mission to the native populations living south of St. Augustine and in the Cape Canaveral area. This mission resulted in a "Period of Friendship" between the Spanish and the Ais native population.

When Pedro de Ibarra became the Spanish Governor of Florida, he knew the Spanish needed to improve relations with the natives, so he sent Mexia on a diplomatic mission in 1605 to gain knowledge of the lands and populations south of St. Augustine, as well as to assist that year's treasure fleet on its way back to Spain.

Mexia wrote about his experiences among the native Ais in a document known as a Derrotero, a self-proclaimed "truthful account" and description of his journey in the land of the Ais. Mexia also created a map in color. His journey completed in 1605, his Derrotero and map were sent to the King of Spain in a letter from Pedro de Ibarra.

His letters and map show native towns and place names south of St. Augustine. These include:

 Surruque In New Smyrna Beach. Mexia and his party arrived at Surruque on June 6, 1605, and remained in the area for eight days while he waited for orders to proceed to the Ais Indian Nation.
 Nocoroco town – mouth of Tomoka River, in Volusia County
 After leaving Nocoroco Mexia writes about passing by a buhio, a West Indian (Arawak) word for a native hut. It came to be applied to anything from the family dwelling to the large communal lodge which according to Bishop Calderon, would accommodate 2000 to 3000 people.
 Caparca site – New Smyrna (Volusia County)
 Potopotoya – Haulover Canal, place where Native Americans crossed land with their canoes
 Savo
 Lagoon of Sababoche – southern extent of the present-day Banana River
 Town of Savochequeya – present-day Newfound Harbor on Merritt Island, Florida
 Lagoon of Ulumay – the Banana River Lagoon north of the Lagoon of Sababoche
 Through "Callejon" to Pentoaya (Indian Harbor Beach on the barrier island and Eau Gallie on the mainland), a Distance of 
 Traverse of the Grand Bay of Ais 
 Two small islands in the Indian River Lagoon (one of which was Grant Farm Island)
 Then to a small fresh water river, now called the Sebastian River 
 Then to the great Indian town of the Ais 1.5 leagues away (or about 4.5 to 5 miles), now called the Kroegel Homestead, but also called Barker's Bluff (8IR84) prior to the mound being sold for road-fill in the early 1900s

Alvaro returned to St. Augustine and made his report to Ibarra on July 11, 1605, more than a month after
his departure. Agreements were made that the Ais Indians would return shipwrecked sailors to the Spanish for a ransom.

References

Further reading
 Brech, Alan and J. F. Lanham. "The Location of the Paramount Town of the Ais Indians and the General Location of the Indians of Santa Lucia." The Florida Anthropologist, Sept. - Dec. 2010.
 Lanham, J. F. and Alan Brech. "Summer Pentoaya: Locating a Prominent Ais Indian Town Along the Indian River Lagoon, Florida." The Florida Anthropologist, March 2007.
 Library of Congress Archives: A copy of the Pedro de Ibarra letter referring Alvaro Mexia to the King of Spain is in v. 5, and Lowery's manuscript collections relating to Florida, 1603- 1607, archived in the Manuscript Division.
 Archive copies of Mexia's writings are archived at General Archive of the Indies
Catalogued as Simancas, La Florida: Descubrimientos, descripciones, y poblaciones de laFlorida. Patronato. Est I; Cat I Leg 1/19; No.29
 Duplicate: Simancas, Seculares, Audencia de Santo Domingo: Cartas y expedientes de gobernadores de la Florida vistos en el Consejo desde 1568  Est 54: Caj. 5 Leg 9.
Nocoroco mentions Alvaro Mexia

External links
 The Florida Anthropologist, Sept-Dec. 2010  http://ufdc.ufl.edu/UF00027829/00210/7j
The Florida Anthropologist, March 2007  http://ufdc.ufl.edu/UF00027829/00200/23j
General Archive of the Indies in Seville, Spain
Mexia's map of Florida in: 

17th-century explorers
Explorers of Florida
Spanish explorers of North America
People from Cape Canaveral, Florida